The 2003 Champ Car Grand Prix of Mid-Ohio was the thirteenth round of the 2003 CART World Series season, held on August 10, 2003 at the Mid-Ohio Sports Car Course in Lexington, Ohio.  It was the last of 22 Champ Car events to take place at the track which was a fixture in the CART calendar for most of its history.

Qualifying results

Race

Caution flags

Notes 

 Average Speed 106.251 mph

External links
 Full Weekend Times & Results

Mid-Ohio
Indy 200 at Mid-Ohio
Champ Car Grand Prix